The Bragg peak is a pronounced peak on the Bragg curve which plots the energy loss of ionizing radiation during its travel through matter. For protons, α-rays, and other ion rays, the peak occurs immediately before the particles come to rest. It is named after William Henry Bragg, who discovered it in 1903.

When a fast charged particle moves through matter, it ionizes atoms of the material and deposits a dose along its path. A peak occurs because the interaction cross section increases as the charged particle's energy decreases. Energy lost by charged particles is inversely proportional to the square of their velocity, which explains the peak occurring just before the particle comes to a complete stop. In the upper figure, it is the peak for alpha particles of 5.49 MeV moving through air. In the lower figure, it is the narrow peak of the "native" proton beam curve which is produced by a particle accelerator of 250 MeV. The figure also shows the absorption of a beam of energetic photons (X-rays) which is entirely different in nature; the curve is mainly exponential.

This characteristic of proton beams was first recommended for use in cancer therapy by Robert R. Wilson in his 1946 article, Radiological Use of Fast Protons. Wilson studied how the depth of proton beam penetration could be controlled by the energy of the protons. This phenomenon is exploited in particle therapy of cancer, specifically in proton therapy, to concentrate the effect of light ion beams on the tumor being treated while minimizing the effect on the surrounding healthy tissue. 

The blue curve in the figure ("modified proton beam") shows how the originally monoenergetic proton beam with the sharp peak is widened by increasing the range of energies, so that a larger tumor volume can be treated. The plateau created by modifying the proton beam is referred to as the spread out Bragg Peak, or SOBP, which allows the treatment to conform to not only larger tumors, but to more specific 3D shapes. This can be achieved by using variable thickness attenuators like spinning wedges.

See also
Stopping power (particle radiation)
Bremsstrahlung
Linear energy transfer
Proton therapy

References

External links 
 
 

Ionizing radiation
Experimental particle physics
Radiation therapy